Troides hypolitus, the Rippon's birdwing, is a birdwing butterfly endemic to the Moluccas and Sulawesi. It is not significantly threatened, but it is protected.

Troides hypolitus is a butterfly from the Australasian and Indomalayan realms. The first description was in 1775 by Pieter Cramer. This butterfly is a member of the family Papilionidae. Troides hypolitus is black. It has a chain of golden spots on the hindwings. The females are dark brown and they are bigger than the males.

Description

The wingspan is from 180 to 200 mm.

The male's forewings are black. Some veins are bordered by white colour. The underside is very similar to the upperside. The hindwings are grey. The outer edge is black and it contains a chain of golden spots. The veins are black. The underside is similar to the upperside, but the basic colour is white.

The body (abdomen) is black and yellow, but the underside is white and yellowish. It looks like a wasp. Head and thorax are black. The nape has a red hair-coat.

The sexes are sexually dimorphic. The female covers the upper range of the wingspan and is usually larger than the male. The basic colour of the female is dark brown. Many veins are bordered by white. The golden spots are bigger and they contain a black core. The underside is a very similar to the upperside.

Distribution
Troides hypolitus is found in the Australasia and Indomalayan realms. The distribution is restricted on the Molucca Islands and Sulawesi.

Subspecies

There are four subspecies:
 Troides hypolitus hypolitus (Moluccas)
 Troides hypolitus antiope Rothschild, 1908 (Morotai)
 Troides hypolitus cellularis Rothschild, 1895 (Sulawesi, Talaud)
 Troides hypolitus sulaensis (Staudinger, 1895) (Sula Islands)

Conservation
This butterfly is strictly protected. It is listed in the appendix II from CITES.

Etymology
In Greek mythology Hippolytus was the son of Theseus.

References

D'Abrera, B. (1975) Birdwing Butterflies of the World. Country Life Books, London.

Haugum, Jan; & Low, A. M. (1975): Notes on the status of Troides hypolitus (Cramer) 1775 (Lep.: Papilionidae: Troidini) with a description of a new genus, notes on the status of T. hypolitus cellularis Rothschild 1895, and the apparent dimorphism in the male sex of T. hypolitus sulae The Entomologist's Record and Journal of Variation 87, pp. 111–119, illustration.
Haugum, J. & Low, A.M. 1978-1985. A Monograph of the Birdwing Butterflies. 2 volumes. Scandinavian Press, Klampenborg; 663 pp.
 CITES: (Convention on International Trade in Endangered Species of Wild Fauna and Flora):
Appendix II- (as at 12.02.2008)
 EU regulation on trading with species of wild Fauna and Flora:
Appendix B- (as at 19.08.2005)
 IUCN Red List of threatened species:
no entry- (as at 2008)

External links

Butterflycorner.net Images from Naturhistorisches Museum Wien
Troides hypolitus at Ngypal as Ripponia hypolitus (synonym)
Pteron Images of both sexes, uppersides and undersides.
Indonesia: Island of Sulawesi Ecoregion

Troides
Papilionidae
Butterflies of Indonesia
Butterflies described in 1775